Gaspé is a city at the tip of the Gaspé Peninsula in the Gaspésie–Îles-de-la-Madeleine region of eastern Quebec in Canada. As of the 2021 Canadian Census, the city had a total population of 15,063.

Gaspé is where Jacques Cartier took possession of New France (now part of Canada) in the name of François I of France on July 24, 1534.

Etymology

The most common assumption is that "Gaspé" may come from the Miꞌkmaq word Gespeg which means "Land's end". However, other theories hold that the name may be a mutation of the Basque word geizpe or kerizpe which means "shelter" or "place of refuge". Another theory is that it is named after Portuguese explorer Gaspar Corte-Real, who explored the Labrador in 1500.

In 1600, Englishman Richard Hakluyt used the name Gaspay in his translation of Cosmosgraphie by Jean Alfonse, which became the common spelling in the early 17th century. Thereafter, many other spellings appeared such as Gachepé, Gachepay, Gaschepay, Gaspey, Gaspèche, and Gapèche.

History

Gaspé claims the title of "Cradle of French America", because on June 24, 1534, explorer Jacques Cartier halted in the bay after losing an anchor during a storm and claimed possession of the area by planting a wooden cross with the king's coat of arms and the sentence Vive le Roi de France (meaning "Long live the King of France"). Cartier met there an indigenous tribe that referred to the territory as Honguedo, probably a Mi'kmaq word meaning "meeting place".

Following the Treaty of Paris in 1763, British officers and soldiers acquired free land in Gaspé. And in 1784, they were joined by many Loyalist settlers. From then on, Gaspé became an important commercial fishing centre, especially of cod. In 1804, its post office opened.

In 1833 in Gaspé County there were only ten farmers, all in the Gaspé Bay area (of whom seven were also involved in the fishery), four whalers in Gaspé Bay, five shipbuilders (one a Jersey firm), one blacksmith, two lumber merchants, five shipowners (all of which were Jerseymen), eighteen fish merchants (of whom all but five were Jerseymen) and thirty-two major fishing establishments (of which sixteen were Jersey owned).

Gaspé was incorporated as a village municipality in 1855. From 1861 to 1866, the port of Gaspé was a duty-free port, making shipping the primary economic activity. With some 40 to 50 European ships docking annually, many countries opened consulates in Gaspé, including Italy, United States, Brazil, Portugal, and Norway. By 1911, the railway reached Gaspé. But the town's ambition to become an international shipping and transportation hub ended with the growing importance of the Montreal and Halifax harbours.

During World War II, some 3000 soldiers were stationed at a naval base built at Sandy Beach to patrol the Gulf of Saint Lawrence against German submarines.

In 1959, Gaspé gained city status. In 1971, the city was greatly expanded when it amalgamated these 11 surrounding municipalities (with year of original incorporation):

 Baie-de-Gaspé-Nord (1855)
 Baie-de-Gaspé-Sud (1855)
 Douglastown (1855)
 Grande-Grève (1944)
 Haldimand (1953)
 L'Anse-aux-Griffons (1870)
 Rivière-au-Renard (1933)
 Saint-Alban-du-Cap-des-Rosiers (1896)
 Saint-Majorique (1966)
 Saint-Maurice (1923)
 York (1866)

In subsequent years, the city's area was further expanded by absorbing large tracts of adjacent unorganized territory.

A representation of a small village, with a dozen houses serving as a historical site, was opened in 2015 in front of the Place Jacques-Cartier mall and above the boardwalk along the York River. The village is a monument to Jacques Cartier and serves as a museum for tourists and locals.

Geography 
In addition to the city, Gaspé's territory includes the communities of Cap-aux-Os, Cap-des-Rosiers, Douglastown, Haldimand, Jersey Cove, L'Anse-à-Fugère, L'Anse-à-Valleau, L'Anse-au-Griffon, Penouille, Petit-Cap, Petite-Rivière-au-Renard, Pointe-Jaune, Rivière-au-Renard, Rivière-Morris, Sandy Beach, Saint-Majorique, Saint-Maurice-de-l'Échouerie, Wakeham, and York Centre. French is the first language learnt by most of Gaspé's population where nearly 90% of the population is French Canadian.

Climate
In spite of its coastal position, Gaspé experiences a humid continental climate (Köppen climate classification Dfb) with vast seasonal differences in temperature. Summers are warm but relatively short, whereas winters are very cold given its coastal position, but still far warmer than inland areas of the province. It stays above the subarctic range due to the seasonal lag keeping September temperatures above  in daily mean. As a result of the seasonal lag, March is a proper winter month and is far colder than November. As typical of Quebec, precipitation and resulting snowfall is high due to the reliable winter temperatures below freezing.

Demographics 

Cross of Gaspé

In 1934, the Canadian government commissioned the installation of a monolithic granite cross in Gaspé, for the 400th anniversary of the arrival of Jacques Cartier in Gaspé as of July 24, 1534. The Cross of Gaspé weighs more than 42 tons and was transported by two railcars of the Canadian National Railway from Rivière-à-Pierre. The cross was carried on a coaster to the Gaspé wharf. The cross was erected on its base using a rail system of pulleys and cables, driven by horses. The original craftsmen would be listed at the top of the cross. This cross is the largest monolithic granite cross crafted in Canada.

A commemorative plaque located at the foot of the Cross in Gaspé was inaugurated on August 23, 2009, in memory of artisans from Rivière-à-Pierre who extracted and cut the block of granite. A replica of the Cross of Gaspé was crafted by Rivière-à-Pierre craftsmen and erected in the heart of the village of Rivière-à-Pierre. That granite cross is half the height of the original cross.

Economy

The regional hospital is the main employer in the city. Tourism is a very important part of the city and the region's economy. Many visitors come to the city to enjoy the environment and the surrounding attractions, such as Forillon National Park that is fully within the city's boundaries. One of the main summer attractions for tourists is salmon fishing. The York River, Saint John's River, and the Dartmouth River are where tourists and locals come to fish. It is not required to have a guide while fishing these rivers but a private guide can be hired upon request. Other tourist attractions include Haldimand Beach, Jacques Cartier's Cross (stone monument), and a local museum which shelters the World War I and World War II cenotaph commemorating Gaspesian veterans.

Another big employer is the LM Wind Power Canada Inc. factory that makes the windmill blades to then have them transported elsewhere. The windmill factory is a tourist attraction where tourist can see the big size of the blades and have the opportunity to take a picture next to one. The factory was expanded in 2015 by a joint venture with Senvion to produce long-blade turbine components for the Mesgi'g Ugju's'n wind farm, developed by Longueuil, Quebec-based  Innergex in Avignon Township. The $365-million project, one of over two dozen financed by Hydro-Quebec and the provincial government, was completed on time in December 2016.

Transportation

Gaspé is accessible by automobile or Orléans Express bus service via Quebec Route 132, and the Michel-Pouliot Gaspé Airport.

The town is also accessible by Quebec Route 198 that passes through the interior of the peninsula. Select travellers can also access the town during the winter via one of the many snowmobile trails that run through the interior and connect with many other towns on the northern and southern coasts of the peninsula. In the summer the same trails are open to all-terrain vehicle travellers as well.

Via Rail's Montreal–Gaspé train was terminated due to unsafe trackage sometime in 2013. Via was offering bus service between New Carlisle and Gaspé. The line was undergoing repairs since December 2011. At present time Via has no plans to reinstate service on this line.

The Port of Gaspé is accessible year-round with the occasional help of an icebreaker.

Its near neighbour Chandler is a port of call for Le Vacancier, a ferry which links Montréal to the Îles-de-la-Madeleine.

Local government
List of former mayors:

 Arthur Drolet (–2003)
 François Roussy (2003–2013)
 Daniel Côté (2013–present)

International relationships
Gaspé is twinned with:
  Puerto Montt, Chile (2005)
  Saint-Malo, France (2009)

See also
 Gaspé (electoral district)
 List of cities in Quebec

References

Notes

External links 

 Ville de Gaspé

 
Cities and towns in Quebec
Populated coastal places in Canada
1971 establishments in Canada